The Waianiwaniwa River (Waireka) is a river in the Canterbury region of the South Island of New Zealand.

Location
The source is in the Wyndale Hills, which are foothills of the Southern Alps / Kā Tiritiri o te Moana. The Waianiwaniwa River is a tributary of the Selwyn River / Waikirikiri.

History
The Waianiwaniwa Valley originally belonged to the Deans family. This particular block belonged to one of the Deans sisters and she sold it to the Hawke family. The Hawkes broke it in turning tussock country into dairying country. The homes built by William A Hawke and Ernie Hawke still stand. The first farmer to use top dressing aircraft was Ernie Hawke on this property.

The Central Plains Water Enhancement Scheme is opposed by environmental groups such as Fish and Game and Forest and Bird, and by the locally based Malvern Hills Protection Society.

Māori knew it as Waireka (Sweet Water)

References

Rivers of Canterbury, New Zealand
Rivers of New Zealand